Pakino is a rural locality (a settlement) in Malyginskoye Rural Settlement, Kovrovsky District, Vladimir Oblast, Russia. The population was 4,605 as of 2010. There are 6 streets.

Geography 
Pakino is located 12 km west of Kovrov (the district's administrative centre) by road. Kovrov is the nearest rural locality.

References 

Rural localities in Kovrovsky District